The plain-breasted ground dove (Columbina minuta) is a species of bird in the family Columbidae. It lacks the scaled appearance to the feathers of the similar and typically more abundant common ground dove.

Taxonomy
In 1760 the French zoologist Mathurin Jacques Brisson included a description of the plain-breasted ground dove in his six volume Ornithologie based on a specimen that he mistakenly believed had been collected in Santo Domingo of the Dominican Republic. He used the French name La petite tourterelle brune d'Amérique and the Latin Turtur parvus fuscus americanus. Although Brisson coined Latin names, these do not conform to the binomial system and are not recognised by the International Commission on Zoological Nomenclature. When in 1766 the Swedish naturalist Carl Linnaeus updated his Systema Naturae for the twelfth edition, he added 240 species that had been previously described by Brisson. One of these was the plain-breasted ground dove which he placed with the other pigeons in the genus Columba. Linnaeus included a brief description, coined the binomial name Columba minuta and cited Brisson's work. The specific name minuta is from the Latin minutus meaning "small". The type locality was subsequently corrected to Cayenne in French Guiana. The plain-breasted ground dove is now placed in the genus Columbina that was introduced by the German naturalist Johann Baptist von Spix in 1825.

Four subspecies are recognised:
 C. m. interrupta (Griscom, 1929) – south Mexico to Belize, Guatemala, and Nicaragua
 C. m. elaeodes (Todd, 1913) – Costa Rica to west central Colombia
 C. m. minuta (Linnaeus, 1766) – east Colombia and Venezuela through the Guianas to south Brazil and northeast Argentina
 C. m. amazilia (Bonaparte, 1855) – southwest Ecuador, northwest Peru

Description
The plain-breasted ground dove may be the smallest pigeons or doves by mass, though the more heavily built but almost tailless dwarf fruit dove of Southeast Asia is typically shorter in overall length.

Distribution and habitat
It is found in Argentina, Belize, Bolivia, Brazil, Colombia, Costa Rica, Ecuador, El Salvador, French Guiana, Guatemala, Guyana, Honduras, Mexico, Nicaragua, Panama, Paraguay, Peru, Suriname, Trinidad and Tobago, and Venezuela. Its natural habitats are dry savanna, subtropical or tropical dry shrubland, subtropical or tropical high-altitude shrubland, subtropical or tropical seasonally wet or flooded lowland grassland, and heavily degraded former forest.

References

plain-breasted ground dove
Birds of Central America
Birds of South America
Birds of Trinidad and Tobago
plain-breasted ground dove
plain-breasted ground dove
Taxonomy articles created by Polbot